Cine Mestizo is a subscription streaming service focused on Venezuelan films.

History 
Once Upon a Time in Venezuela estuvo disponible en la plataforma durante su postulación a los Óscars. Cine Mestizo was among the platforms that offered the film catalog of the second edition of the Miradas Diversas International Human Rights Film Festival, which took place between 25 November and 19 December 2020.

In 2021, it initiated the film heritage recovery program "Visual Thinking: Beyond Competition" in conjunction with the Foundation for the Development of Arts and Culture (Fundearc) to contribute to the formation of audiovisual education centers in Venezuela. Between April 7 and 14, 2021 presented the VI Annual Exhibition of Short Films of the Escuela Nacional de Cine (ENC).

Cine Mestizo has offered online options to watch screenings of the Venezuelan Film Festival in the state of Merida in 2021 and 2022.

References

External links 

 Official website

Online mass media companies
Subscription video on demand services
Establishments in Venezuela by year
Entertainment companies by year of establishment
Mass media companies by year of establishment